George Kay Whyte McGuckin (born 11 August 1938) is a Scottish former professional footballer who played as a wing half. He made four appearances in the Football League for Cardiff City.

References

1938 births
Living people
Scottish footballers
Cardiff City F.C. players
English Football League players
Association football wing halves